The 2017 Iowa Hawkeyes football team represented the University of Iowa in the 2017 NCAA Division I FBS football season. The Hawkeyes, led by 19th-year head coach Kirk Ferentz, were members of the West Division of the Big Ten Conference and played their home games at Kinnick Stadium in Iowa City, Iowa. They finished the season 8–5, 4–5 in Big Ten play to finish in a tie for third place in the West Division. They received an invite to the Pinstripe Bowl where they defeated Boston College.

The Iowa football program was awarded Disney's Wide World of Sports Spirit Award for the Kinnick Wave, a new tradition that began during the season, where, at the end of the first quarter of every home game everyone in the stadium turned and waved to the young patients watching from the Stead Family Children's Hospital, which overlooks Kinnick Stadium. This season marked the first time since 1980 that the Tigerhawk logo was displayed at midfield in Kinnick Stadium.

Previous season 
The Hawkeyes finished the 2016 season 8–5, 6–3 in Big Ten play to finish in second place in the West Division. They received an invite to the Outback Bowl where they lost to Florida.

Offseason

Recruiting

Position key

2017 commitments 

The Hawkeyes signed a total of 22 recruits.

Schedule 
Iowa announced its 2017 football schedule on July 11, 2013. The 2017 schedule consisted of seven home and five away games in the regular season. The Hawkeyes hosted Big Ten foes Illinois, Minnesota, Ohio State, Penn State, and Purdue, and traveled to Michigan State, Nebraska, Northwestern, and Wisconsin.

The team hosted two non–conference games against the Wyoming Cowboys from the Mountain West Conference and the North Texas Mean Green from Conference USA. Sandwiched between those matchups was a trip to Ames for the annual Cy-Hawk rivalry game against the Iowa State Cyclones from the Big 12 Conference.

Source:

Roster

Rankings

Game summaries

Wyoming 

Source: Box Score

Iowa opened up the 2017 football season against the Wyoming Cowboys and highly rated Wyoming quarterback Josh Allen. The Hawkeyes got off to a slow start, but after Wyoming punter Tim Zaleski missed the ball on the attempted punt, the Hawkeyes took a 14-3 lead at the half. Iowa built on the momentum with a 45-yard pass from first-year starter Nate Stanley to wide receiver Nick Easley. Iowa wins the season opener 24-3. Iowa's defense impressed many, holding Josh Allen to only 174 yards and 17 incompletions, and a quarterback rating of 24.9. Iowa defense also picked off Allen twice.

This game marked the debut of the "Kinnick Wave", a new Iowa football tradition in which fans turn toward the children's hospital that overlooks the playing field at the end of the first quarter and wave to patients and their families watching the game from the hospital.

at Iowa State 

Source: Box Score 

Iowa's first rivalry game of the year was the Cy-Hawk series against Big 12 foe Iowa State. Iowa State comes in fresh off a 42-3 beatdown in Iowa City the past year. ISU's 2nd year coach Matt Campbell referred to Iowa as the "team out east" in pregame preparations. This game had a relatively slow beginning and Iowa appeared to be in control well into the third quarter. However, Iowa State's offense exploded and put up 28 points in the second half. The game ultimately went to OT and the "team out east" prevailed with a Nate Stanley touchdown pass.

North Texas 

Source: Box Score

Penn State 

Source: Box Score

at Michigan State 

Source: Box Score

Illinois 

Source: Box Score

Illinois played with Iowa well into the third quarter. The Hawkeyes appeared lethargic but a Brandon Snyder interception sparked an Iowa rally and they dominated the rest of the way.

at Northwestern 

Source: Box Score

Minnesota 

Source: Box Score

Ohio State 

Source: Box Score

Iowa was able to defeat Ohio State for the first time since 2004 in this blowout victory. The Buckeyes played with the Hawkeyes for most of the first half but from there the game belonged to Iowa. It was one of the most impressive wins of the Ferentz era and Nate Stanley's most distinguished to that point as well. Tight ends Noah Fant and T. J. Hockenson combined for 9 receptions, 125 yards, and 4 touchdowns. Defensive back and future NFL player Josh Jackson also had an outstanding game, tying an Iowa school record with three interceptions.

at Wisconsin 

Source: Box Score

Purdue 

Source: Box Score

at Nebraska 

Source: Box Score

Nebraska got out to a fast start and was up 14-7 in the second quarter with Iowa struggling to move the ball. The script completely flipped from that point though as the Hawkeyes scored 49 unanswered points and shutout the Cornhuskers in the second half.

vs. Boston College (Pinstripe Bowl) 

Source: Box Score

Iowa was able to end their bowl drought in this contest with Boston College. The Hawkeyes had trouble containing the Eagles' offense but with second half adjustments held them to just a field goal which came with only a few minutes left in the fourth quarter. The victory was bowl win number seven for Kirk Ferentz and tied legendary coach Hayden Fry in career wins with 143.

Awards and honors

Postseason Awards 
Josey Jewell – Big Ten Defensive Player of the Year, Big Ten Linebacker of the Year, Jack Lambert Award, Unanimous First-team All-American
Josh Jackson – Big Ten Defensive Back of the Year, Jack Tatum Award, Unanimous First-team All-American

Players in the 2018 NFL Draft

References 

Iowa
Iowa Hawkeyes football seasons
Pinstripe Bowl champion seasons
Iowa Hawkeyes football